The Age of Innocence is a 1920 novel by Edith Wharton.

The Age of Innocence  may also refer to:

Film 
Adaptations of Wharton's novel:
 The Age of Innocence (1924 film), an American silent film directed by Wesley Ruggles
 The Age of Innocence (1934 film), an American film directed by Philip Moeller
 The Age of Innocence (1993 film), an American film directed by Martin Scorsese

Other films:
The Age of Innocence (1976 film), a Soviet film directed by Vladimir Rogovoy; also called Minors; Russian: Несовершеннолетние
Age of Innocence (1977 film), a Canadian film directed by Alan Bridges; also called Ragtime Summer

Music
 The Age of Innocence (album), by Jolin Tsai, 2003
 Age of Innocence, an EP, or its title song, by the Pearly Gatecrashers, 1992
 "The Age of Innocence", a song by Lala Hsu from The Inner Me, 2017
 "Age of Innocence", a song by Elephante, 2016
 "Age of Innocence", a song by Iron Maiden from Dance of Death, 2003
 "Age of Innocence", a song by Smashing Pumpkins from Machina/The Machines of God, 2000

Other uses
 The Age of Innocence (Hamilton book), a 1995 photo-book by David Hamilton
 The Age of Innocence (painting), a 1785/1788 oil by Joshua Reynolds
 Age of Innocence (TV series), a 2002 South Korean drama